

The Boston Aquarial Gardens (1859-1860) was a public aquarium in Boston, Massachusetts, established by James Ambrose Cutting and Henry D Butler.  The "conservatories [were] filled with rare marine animals imported and collected exclusively for this establishment; ... a perfect and striking illustration of life beneath the waters." The business was located on Bromfield Street in the Financial District.

In 1860 it moved to a new facility nearby, on Central Court, off Washington Street, and re-opened as the Boston Aquarial and Zoological Gardens.

References

Further reading
 "Mrs. Partington Visits the Fishes". New Hampshire Patriot and State Gazette; Date: 08-17-1859
 Catalogue of fishes, mollusca, zoophytes, &c., &c., at Aquarial Gardens, no.21 Bromfield Street, Boston; Cutting & Butler, proprietors. In: Willem Theodorus Gevers Deynoot. Aanteekeningen op eene reis door de Vereenigde Staten van Noord Amerika en Canada, in 1859. The Hague: M. Nijhoff, 1860. Google books
 Aquarial Gardens. Barre Gazette (Barre, Massachusetts); Date: 07-20-1860

External links

 New England Aquarium. The Boston Aquarial Gardens (1859 - 1860).

Image gallery

Former buildings and structures in Boston
1859 establishments in Massachusetts
1860 disestablishments in Massachusetts
Cultural history of Boston
19th century in Boston
Aquaria in Massachusetts
Financial District, Boston
Articles needing infobox zoo